Gastone  is a 1960 Italian comedy film co-written and directed  by Mario Bonnard and starring Alberto Sordi, Anna Maria Ferrero and Vittorio De Sica. It is loosely based on the Ettore Petrolini's character and comedy play with the same name.

Plot
Italy, 1920s. The suffered glimmers of war seem very far away, especially if and when you have the opportunity to have fun in places like the tabarin: it is here that Gastone, aka Gaston Le Beau, profession danseur mondain, accompanied by the inseparable tailcoat, performs dancing with extreme elegance and entertains the wealthy ladies who go there.

Enclosed in the magnificent image of "bell'Adone", a woman-wasting dancer, elegant and sexy, Gastone is actually a frivolous and artless character, a well-known scammer at the police station who not only cares about being desired by the admirers but wants something else: success, that full glory and never achieved due to the outbreak of the Great War. Surrounded by equally fatuous and in some cases dishonest characters, including princes, loan sharks and beautiful women, Gastone cultivates his ambitions when a new student, Nannina, enrolls in his improvised dance school. It is not just a young and beautiful girl employed as a maid with nobles, but an excellent dancer, ambitious and determined. With her, Gaston deludes himself that he has finally found the new star of the club, the perfect dance partner. But, upon entering the scene, Gaston is suddenly taken to the police station for a complaint and Nannina, now known as Anna La Belle, performs alone and has a huge consensus.

Thus began, a little by chance and a lot for talent and with the help of a famous impresario, the new solo career of Nannina, able in a short time to reach the highest fame performing in the most famous theaters and clubs in Europe. Missing the opportunity, Gaston proves unable to realize that the public's tastes have changed and that his glossy world is on the way to sunset. Now forgotten, disheartened and penniless, Gaston looks for the last chance by returning to perform in a second-rate club with Rosa, an old flame always devoted. But the last performance turns out to be a total fiasco and the bel danseur, reduced to poverty, has only a vain consolation left: to see Nannina again perhaps for one last time, thus leaving the scene convinced that he is, always and in any case, the most beautiful and desired.

Cast
Alberto Sordi as  Gastone
Anna Maria Ferrero as  Nannina
Vittorio De Sica as The Prince
Paolo Stoppa as  Achille
Franca Marzi as  Rosa
Chelo Alonso as  Carmencita
Magali Noël as  Sonia
Tino Scotti as  The Illusionist 
Angela Luce as  Yvonne
Nando Bruno as  Michele
Salvo Libassi as The Commissioner
Mimmo Palmara as The Agent
Mino Doro as  Cavallini
Linda Sini as  Lucy
Livio Lorenzon as  Captain Negri
Nanda Primavera as  Donna Flora
Anna Campori as The Singer

References

External links

Gastone at Variety Distribution

1961 comedy films
1961 films
Italian comedy films
Films directed by Mario Bonnard
Italian films based on plays
Films about actors
Films set in Rome
Films scored by Angelo Francesco Lavagnino
1960s Italian films